Heath Creek is a stream in Alberta, Canada.

Heath Creek has the name of William Heath, a pioneer citizen.

See also
List of rivers of Alberta

References

Rivers of Alberta